Bobby Lammie (born 10 February 1997) is a Scottish curler from Stranraer. He currently plays second on Team Bruce Mouat.

Career

Juniors
Lammie has been a part of the Mouat rink since 2015 when they were in juniors. Lammie was the alternate on the team at the 2015 World Junior Curling Championships, where they won a bronze medal. The following year, Lammie was promoted to third, and they won a gold medal at the 2016 World Junior Curling Championships. The following year, the team won the gold medal at the 2017 Winter Universiade. While the team was still in juniors, they won the 2015 Dumfries Challenger Series World Curling Tour event. Their gold medal at the 2016 World Juniors qualified the rink to play in the 2016 Humpty's Champions Cup Grand Slam event, where they lost in a tiebreaker.

Mixed
Lammie has played in two World Mixed Curling Championship, playing second on Team Scotland, skipped by Cameron Bryce. At the 2015 World Mixed Curling Championship, the team finished 9th. They improved at the 2016 World Mixed Curling Championship, where they won a bronze medal.

Men's
After juniors, the Mouat rink found immediate success on the World Curling Tour, winning the Stu Sells Oakville Tankard and Oakville OCT Fall Classic tour events to begin the season. The Team would win the 2017 Boost National, becoming the first Scottish team to win a Grand Slam title. Also, on the tour that season, the team would win the Dumfries Challenger Series and the Aberdeen International Curling Championship. The team had less success at the second slam they played in that season, the 2018 Meridian Canadian Open, failing to make it to the playoffs. Later in the season, the team won the Scottish Men's Curling Championship and defeated the British Olympic team (skipped by Kyle Smith) in a playoff to earn the right to represent Scotland at the 2018 World Men's Curling Championship.

Personal life
Lammie attended Stranraer Academy, Edinburgh Napier University and University of Stirling where he studied Sport and Exercise Science. He lives in Stirling.

References

External links

Living people
1997 births
Scottish male curlers
People from Stranraer
People educated at Stranraer Academy
Universiade medalists in curling
Alumni of Edinburgh Napier University
Alumni of the University of Stirling
European curling champions
Continental Cup of Curling participants
Universiade gold medalists for Great Britain
Competitors at the 2017 Winter Universiade
Curlers at the 2022 Winter Olympics
Olympic curlers of Great Britain
Medalists at the 2022 Winter Olympics
Olympic silver medallists for Great Britain
Olympic medalists in curling
Curlers from Stirling
Scottish Olympic medallists